Eudaemonia argus is a species of moth in the  family Saturniidae. It is found in Africa, in such areas as Gabon, Nigeria, Ivory Coast, Togo, Guinea and Benin. Adults have wings with shades of pinkish to brownish, with several small eyespots on the hindwings; the males have much longer and thinner "tails" on the hindwings than the females.

References

Moths described in 1781
argus